Prince Abdul Hakeem Jefri Bolkiah (born 13 June 1973) is a sport shooter from Brunei. He is a member of the Brunei Royal Family.

Biography
Prince Abdul Hakeem (or Hakim) Bolkiah is the eldest son of Jefri Bolkiah, Prince of Brunei and nephew of Hassanal Bolkiah, the current Sultan of Brunei. After education at Emanuel School in London, he competed in the men's skeet shooting events at the 1996 and 2000 Summer Olympics.  In the 1996 event, he tied for 49th place, while in the 2000 event, he placed 45th; he failed to qualify for the finals in either year.

Positions
 Managing Director of the Amedeo Development Corporation (ADC) until 1998.
 Managing Director of the Datastream Technology.
 Chairman of The Lexicon Group Limited (Singapore) since 2010.
 Director of Amedeo Holdings Inc.
 Director of PH Partners Inc.
 Director of Palace Holdings Inc.
 Director of Kava Holdings Inc.
 Cedar Swamp Holdings Inc.
 President of the Brunei Bullets Football Club 1995. 
 Represented Brunei at the Olympic Games in Sydney 2000 and Athens 2004 in shooting (skeet). 
 Vice-President of the Brunei Amateur Football Association (BAFA) since 2001.

Controversies 
On 8 September 2012 it was reported that the prince was being sued by 9 investors because of a disagreement over the transfer of some 80 million shares in the Singapore-listed Elektromotive Group to those shareholders. It was reported that among those who were suing was Citi's Chief Singapore and Malaysia Economist, Kit Wei Zheng, Ms Eileen Ong and Mr Chan Kwai Sum. Eventually the Prince agreed to pay the full amount demanded by the investors of S$890,000 as well as legal costing amounting to $50,000. The prince suggested that he had been used as a "figurehead" to gain the trust of investors. However, Elektromotive Group was struggling financially.

Honours

National 
  Pingat Indah Kerja Baik (Medal for Service to State - PIKB, 2 March 2017).
  Brunei Independence (1 January 1984).
  Sultan of Brunei Golden Jubilee Medal (5 October 2017).
  Silver Jubilee Medal (5 October 1992).

International 
  Silver Olympic Order, 1999.

Ancestry

References

External links

|-

Living people
People educated at Emanuel School
Shooters at the 1996 Summer Olympics
Shooters at the 2000 Summer Olympics
Olympic shooters of Brunei
Bruneian male sport shooters
Bruneian royalty
Royal Olympic participants
1973 births